The 2016 Men's AHF Cup was the fifth edition of the Men's AHF Cup, the quadrennial qualification tournament for the Men's Hockey Asia Cup organised by the Asian Hockey Federation. The tournament was held from 19 to 27 November 2016 at the King's Park Hockey Stadium in Hong Kong.

Final standings

See also
 2016 Women's AHF Cup

References

Men's AHF Cup
AHF Cup
International field hockey competitions hosted by Hong Kong
AHF Cup
AHF Cup